Kuk Young is a South Korean physicist, former physics professor and vice-provost of research of Seoul National University, distinguished professor of Ewha Womans University, and chairman of the Samsung Science and Technology Foundation. He is a fellow of the American Physical Society, Korean Academy of Science and Technology, Institute of Physics, Korean Physical Society, and Korean Vacuum Society. He has performed editor roles for the journals Nanotechnology, ACS Nano, and Solid State Electronics and is the fourth president of Daegu Gyeongbuk Institute of Science and Technology (DGIST).

Education
Kuk graduated from Kyunggi High School in 1971 and then went to Seoul National University, where he majored in physics and graduated with a B.S. and M.S. in 1975 and 1978, respectively. Continuing with a physics major, he graduated from Pennsylvania State University in 1981 with a Ph.D.

Career 
With doctorate in hand, Young became a member of the technical staff at AT&T Bell Laboratories; a position he continued for a decade. Returning to Korea in 1991, he became a professor of physics and astronomy at Seoul National University (SNU) for the next 27 years. Between March 2002 and December 2004, he was a special committee member for nanoscience within the National Science and Technology Commission. For two years, he was vice-provost for research in the Office of Research Affairs of SNU, at the end of which he also became a fellow of the Korean Academy of Science and Technology. For five years he was the chairman of the Samsung Science and Technology Foundation, only ending the position upon becoming president of Daegu Gyeongbuk Institute of Science and Technology.

In April 2018, he became a distinguished professor at Ewha Womans University, during which time he was a team leader in the Institute for Basic Science (IBS) Center for Quantum Nanoscience. His team at Ewha studied quantum materials, specifically two-dimensional superconductors in nanometer scale. He left all positions and responsibilities in March 2019 in order to head the Daegu Gyeongbuk Institute of Science and Technology in April 2019.

Awards 
 2008: Inchon Memorial Awards
 2006: National Scholar, Ministry of Education & Human Resources Development (ko)
 2004: National Academy of Sciences Award, Korea
 2004: 10 Popular Scientists, The Dong-a Ilbo, Korea
 2002: Scientist of the Year in Nano, Korean Ministry of Science and Technology
 1980: E. W. Müller Outstanding Emerging Scientist Award, IFES American Vacuum Society Graduate Student Award

See also
Shin Sung-chul, 1st and 2nd president of DGIST University

References

External links 
 Young Kuk - Google Scholar

Seoul National University alumni
Academic staff of Seoul National University
Eberly College of Science alumni
Fellows of the American Physical Society
Fellows of the Institute of Physics
Academic staff of Ewha Womans University
Institute for Basic Science
Living people
1953 births
South Korean physicists
South Korean scientists